The Australasian Performing Right Association Awards of 2018 (generally known as APRA Awards) are a series of related awards which include the APRA Music Awards, Art Music Awards, and Screen Music Awards. The APRA Music Awards of 2018 was the 36th annual ceremony by the Australasian Performing Right Association (APRA) and the Australasian Mechanical Copyright Owners Society (AMCOS) to award outstanding achievements in contemporary songwriting, composing and publishing. The ceremony was held on 10 April 2018 at the International Convention Centre Sydney. The host for the ceremony was Julia Zemiro.

The Art Music Awards ceremony was held on 21 August 2018 at the Plaza Ballroom, Melbourne. They were presented by APRA, AMCOS and the Australian Music Centre (AMC), to "recognise achievement in the composition, performance, education and presentation of Australian art music. Art music covers activity across contemporary classical music, contemporary jazz and improvised music, experimental music and sound art." The Screen Music Awards were issued on 19 November at the Melbourne Recital Centre by APRA, AMCOS and Australian Guild of Screen Composers (AGSC), which "acknowledges excellence and innovation in the field of screen composition."

In mid-March nominations for the APRA Music Awards were announced on multiple news sources: M-Phazes and Peter James Harding  Thief both received the most with four nominations each. Midnight Oil were honoured by the Ted Albert Award for Outstanding Services to Australian Music. Songwriter of the Year was A.B. Original's Adam Briggs and Daniel Rankine. A new category, Licensee of the Year Award, was introduced and the Settlers Tavern in Margaret River, Western Australia is the inaugural winner.

APRA Music Awards

Blues & Roots Work of the Year

Breakthrough Songwriter of the Year

Country Work of the Year

Dance Work of the Year

International Work of the Year

Licensee of the Year Award

Most Played Australian Work

Most Played Australian Work Overseas

Overseas Recognition Award

Pop Work of the Year

Rock Work of the Year

Song of the Year

Songwriter of the Year

 A.B. Originals Adam Briggs  Briggs and Daniel Rankine  Trials

Ted Albert Award for Outstanding Services to Australian Music

 Midnight Oil members Peter Garrett, Rob Hirst, Martin Rotsey, Jim Moginie and Bones Hillman

Urban Work of the Year

Art Music Awards

Instrumental Work of the Year

Jazz Work of the Year

Orchestral Work of the Year

Vocal / Choral Work of the Year

Performance of the Year

Award for Excellence by an Individual

Award for Excellence by an Organisation

Award for Excellence in Music Education

Award for Excellence in a Regional Area

Award for Excellence in Experimental Music

Award for Excellence in Jazz

Distinguished Services to Australian Music

Screen Music Awards

Feature Film Score of the Year

Best Music for an Advertisement

Best Music for Children's Television

Best Music for a Documentary

Best Music for a Mini-Series or Telemovie

Best Music for a Short Film

Best Music for a Television Series or Serial

Best Original Song Composed for the Screen

Best Soundtrack Album

Best Television Theme

Most Performed Screen Composer – Australia

Most Performed Screen Composer – Overseas

Distinguished Services to the Australian Screen

References

2018 in Australian music
2018 music awards
APRA Awards